Netrnoi Sor Vorasingh (April 22, 1959, in Bua Yai District, Nakhon Ratchasima Province – December 3, 1982 in Phang Khon District, Sakon Nakhon Province) was a Thai world boxing champion.

Biography & career
Sor Vorasingh was born as Netr Ladnork (เนตร ลาดนอก) in poor family in Bua Yai District, Nakhon Ratchasima Province, but raised in Phang Khon District, Sakon Nakhon Province.

Sor Vorasingh turned professional in 1975 at the age of fifteen, after being unsuccessful in Muay Thai style. He had challenged championship three times, the first time with the OPBF light flyweight champion Sang-il Chun of South Korea in 1976, the result was draw. The second time with the WBC light flyweight title holder Luis Estaba at Estaba home, Caracas, Venezuela in 1977. He was defeated via scores over 15 rounds, although he was more likely to win.

For the third time in 1978, he succeeded when he won the WBC light flyweight title with a decision win over Venezuela's Freddy Castillo at Thai Army Sports Stadium, Bangkok. On September 30, 1978, Sung-Jun Kim of South Korea knocked out the 4’10” southpaw Sor Vorasingh in three rounds, making him, at nineteen years and 5 months old, the youngest fighter to ever lose a world title.

In 1981, Sor Vorasingh challenged the WBC light flyweight title holder Hilario Zapata from Panama at Suranari Military Camp, 2nd Army Area, Nakhon Ratchasima Province, but lost to a technical knockout in 10th round.

Behind the scenes of the fight with Zapata, before the bout, Sor Vorasingh's staffs went to see a shaman in Pak Thong Chai, for the shaman to use superstition to help him win. The shaman determines when he will leave the room as well as when he enters the ring, this will coincide with the time when the shaman releases a Khwai Thanu (a kind of Thai superstition object) to help cut off Zapata's strength. The shaman urged him to enter the ring after Zapata, but an error has occurred when Zapata arrives late to the venue. The organizer then let Sor Vorasingh enter the ring first. He later said in an interview that when he boxed, his arms and legs felt unexplained exhaustion.

His last boxing was a loser to Samart Payakaroon a topline Muay Thai fighter who switched to boxing for the first time in 1982 at Lumpinee Stadium. Although he was the loser after 10 rounds, most of the audience yelled with displeasure at the decision, because there was an opinion that he should be the winner.

Death
Sor Vorasingh died on December 3, 1982, in a motorcycle accident in his hometown Phang Khon District, just 4 months after the fight with Payakaroon. He had a record of 29 wins and 7 losses, with 15 wins by knockout.

See also 
 List of light-flyweight boxing champions

References

External links 
 

1959 births
Flyweight boxers
Light-flyweight boxers
World light-flyweight boxing champions
World Boxing Council champions
1982 deaths
Netrnoi Sor Vorasingh
Netrnoi Sor Vorasingh
Road incident deaths in Thailand
Netrnoi Sor Vorasingh
Southpaw boxers
Netrnoi Sor Vorasingh
Netrnoi Sor Vorasingh